Zovax venus is a moth in the family Crambidae. It was described by Graziano Bassi in 2013. It is found in Botswana, Malawi, Mozambique, Namibia and Zimbabwe.

References

Crambinae
Moths described in 2013